The following is a list of Australian television ratings for the year 2020.

Network shares

Most Watched Broadcasts in 2020

Weekly ratings 
From the week beginning, 9 February 2020.

Weekly key demographics 
From the week beginning, 9 February 2020.

Key demographics shares

See also

Television ratings in Australia

References

2019
2019 in Australian television